The Bahamas national football team is controlled by the Bahamas Football Association; it was founded in 1967 and joined FIFA in 1968. Bahamas has never qualified for the FIFA World Cup. They have been a part of CONCACAF since 1967.

History

The Bahamas played their first international matches in the 1970 Central American and Caribbean Games, losing their debut 3–0 against Puerto Rico, an 8–1 loss against Netherlands Antilles and 5–0 to Venezuela. They did manage to get their first draw though, a 2–2 result against Dominican Republic. The following year, Bahamas participated in the 1971 Pan American Games, achieving their first victory over Dominican Republic 4–2, but failing to exit the group stages. They returned to play in the 1974 Central American and Caribbean Games, and managed a historic 1–0 victory against Panama, but lost 3–0 to Bermuda and 2–0 to the Dominican Republic and was eliminated again in the first round.

Bahamas finished bottom of their group in the 1982 Central American and Caribbean Games and in the 1986 edition, they were given a bye into the quarterfinals due to a withdrawal, however Bahamas were beaten by Cuba and eliminated. They also participated in the qualifying rounds for the 1984 Olympic Games (eliminated by an amateur Mexico team) and the 1988 Olympics (beaten by Guyana). On 28 April 1987, the Bahamas experienced their worst defeat at the hands of the Mexican team, who crushed them 13–0 as part of the qualifying tournament for the 1987 Pan American Games.

In the 1990s, the Bahamas withdrew from 1998 World Cup qualifying, leaving Saint Kitts and Nevis to advance to the next round. Bahamas advanced past the preliminary round 1999 Caribbean Cup, but failed to beat Bermuda (0–6), Cuba (0–7) and the Cayman Islands (1–4) and finished last in their group.

The 2000s saw the Baha Boyz enter three consecutive World Cup qualifiers; 2002, 2006 and 2010 being eliminated by Haiti (aggregate score 13–0), Dominica (aggregate score 4–2) and Jamaica (aggregate score 13–0), respectively. In the 2007 Caribbean Cup they got through the first knockout round but finished in last position in the second qualifying round behind Barbados, Saint Vincent and Bermuda.

In the 2014 World Cup qualifiers, the Bahamas thrashed the Turks and Caicos Islands with an aggregate score of 10–0, advancing to the second phase however, the team withdrew from the competition as the renovations for the Thomas Robinson Stadium were not completed and playing the fixtures at neutral venues would have been financially prohibitive. In the 2018 World Cup qualifying, they faced Bermuda in the first round, losing 8–0 on aggregate. In the first round of 2022 World Cup qualification, Bahamas failed to score a goal, finishing in last place, having conceded 15.

Recent results and forthcoming fixtures

The following is a list of match results in the last 12 months, as well as any future matches that have been scheduled.

2022

2023

Coaching history

 Randy Rogers (1987-1998)
 Peter Wilson (1998–1999)
 Gary White (1999–2006)
 Neider dos Santos (2006–2010)
 Paul James (2011)
 Kevin Davies (2011–2014)
 Nesley Jean (2014)
 Dion Godet (2014–2018)
 Nesley Jean (2019–2022)

Players

Current squad
 The following players were called up for the 2022–23 CONCACAF Nations League matches.
 Match dates: 3, 7, 10 and 14 June 2022
 Caps and goals correct as of:' 14 June 2022, after the match against 

Recent call-ups

  = Withdrew due to injury
  = Preliminary squad
  = Training player
   = Withdrew (non-injury)
  = Retired

Player recordsPlayers in bold are still active with Bahamas.

Competitive record
FIFA World Cup

CONCACAF Gold Cup

CONCACAF Nations League

CFU Caribbean Cup

Pan American Games

Central American and Caribbean Games
 1950–1986: Amateur squads

Head-to-head recordAs of 14 May 2022 after match against ''

References

External links
 Bahamas Football Association Website                 
 Bahamas in National Football Teams
 Bahamas in FIFA.com

 
Caribbean national association football teams